James Borrego (born November 12, 1977) is an American professional basketball coach who most recently served as the head coach of the Charlotte Hornets of the National Basketball Association.

Early life and playing career
Borrego was born on November 12, 1977, in Albuquerque, New Mexico and is of Mexican American descent. He played three seasons with the San Diego Toreros, and during his senior season (2000–01) was named to the West Coast Conference All-Academic Team.

Coaching career
Borrego began his coaching career with his alma mater, University of San Diego, as an assistant from 2001 to 2003. During his tenure, San Diego captured the West Coast Conference Championship and earned a trip to the NCAA Tournament in the 2002–2003 season.

After his coaching stay with the Toreros, Borrego began in 2003 his career in professional basketball with the San Antonio Spurs, starting as an assistant video coordinator in the summer of 2003 and being promoted to assistant coach afterwards. He spent seven seasons with the Spurs, being part of two NBA championship teams in 2005 and 2007 before leaving the team to join former Spurs' assistant Monty Williams when he took the head coach job with the New Orleans Hornets from 2010 until 2012.

Afterwards, he joined Jacque Vaughn as the lead assistant for the Orlando Magic. He took over the Magic when Vaughn was fired on February 5, 2015. On February 6, he made his coaching debut against the Los Angeles Lakers, winning 103–97 in overtime. On February 17, he became the coach of the team for the rest of the season.

On June 17, 2015, he returned to the Spurs as an assistant coach for Gregg Popovich.

On May 10, 2018, the Charlotte Hornets named Borrego as their new head coach, signing him to a four-year deal with the team. Borrego became the first Latino head coach in the NBA's 72-year history.

On April 22, 2022, Borrego was fired by the Hornets.

Personal life
Born and raised in Albuquerque, New Mexico, Borrego led Albuquerque Academy to a pair of state championships. In 2001, he earned a bachelor's degree in English and a master's degree in leadership studies from the University of San Diego.

He and his wife have a daughter and two sons.

Head coaching record

|-
| align="left"|Orlando
| align="left"|
| 30||10||20|||| align="center"|5th in Southeast || — || — || — || —
| align="center"|Missed playoffs
|-
| align="left"|Charlotte
| align="left"|
| 82||39||43|||| align="center"|2nd in Southeast || — || — || — || —
| align="center"|Missed playoffs
|-
| align="left"|Charlotte
| align="left"|
| 65||23||42|||| align="center"|4th in Southeast || — || — || — || —
| align="center"|Missed playoffs
|-
| align="left"|Charlotte
| align="left"|
| 72||33||39|||| align="center"|4th in Southeast || — || — || — || —
| align="center"|Missed playoffs
|-
| align="left"|Charlotte
| align="left"|
| 82||43||39|||| align="center"|3rd in Southeast || — || — || — || —
| align="center"|Missed playoffs
|-
| align="center" colspan="2"|Career
| 331 || 148 || 183 ||  || || — || — || — || — ||

References

External links
College playing statistics

1977 births
Living people
American men's basketball coaches
American men's basketball players
American sportspeople of Mexican descent
Basketball coaches from New Mexico
Basketball players from Albuquerque, New Mexico
Charlotte Hornets head coaches
Forwards (basketball)
New Orleans Hornets assistant coaches
Orlando Magic assistant coaches
Orlando Magic head coaches
San Antonio Spurs assistant coaches
San Diego Toreros men's basketball coaches
San Diego Toreros men's basketball players